Lyubomir Velichkov (born 19 June 1985) is a Bulgarian football player, currently playing for Vidima-Rakovski as a striker.

Height – 1.92 m.
Weight – 83 kg.

External links

1985 births
Living people
Bulgarian footballers
FC Lokomotiv 1929 Sofia players
OFC Vihren Sandanski players
PFC Nesebar players
PFC Beroe Stara Zagora players
FC Sportist Svoge players
PFC Vidima-Rakovski Sevlievo players
First Professional Football League (Bulgaria) players
Association football forwards